Tsvetanka Stancheva (born 18 August 1929) is a Bulgarian gymnast. She competed at the 1952 Summer Olympics and the 1956 Summer Olympics.

References

External links
  

1929 births
Possibly living people
Bulgarian female artistic gymnasts
Olympic gymnasts of Bulgaria
Gymnasts at the 1952 Summer Olympics
Gymnasts at the 1956 Summer Olympics
Place of birth missing (living people)